Liverpool is a city and port in Merseyside, England, which contains many listed buildings.  A listed building is a structure designated by English Heritage of being of architectural and/or of historical importance and, as such, is included in the National Heritage List for England.  There are three grades of listing, according to the degree of importance of the structure.  Grade I includes those buildings that are of "exceptional interest, sometimes considered to be internationally important"; the buildings in Grade II* are "particularly important buildings of more than special interest"; and those in Grade II are "nationally important and of special interest".  Very few buildings are included in Grade I — only 2.5% of the total.  Grade II* buildings represent 5.5% of the total, while the great majority, 92%, are included in Grade II.

Liverpool contains more than 1,550 listed buildings, of which 28 are in Grade I, 109 in Grade II*, and the rest in Grade II.  This list contains the Grade II listed buildings in the L7 postal district of Liverpool.  The district stretches from buildings used by the University of Liverpool in the area around Abercromby Square in the west of the district, to the suburbs of Edge Hill and Kensington in the east.  It is mainly residential, and a high proportion of the buildings in the list are houses.  Residential development started in 1819–20 in Abercromby Square, and many of the houses here and elsewhere date from the 1820s, 1830s, and 1840s.  To the east, the district includes Edge Hill railway station, the world's first railway station, and there are three Grade II listed buildings relating to it.  Also in the district is Wavertree Botanic Gardens, which contains two Grade II listed buildings, the lodge and a fountain.  In addition to these, this list contains three churches and a chapel (some of which have been converted into other uses), a library, a bank, a public house, a former hospital, the entrance to a cemetery, a students' union, a war memorial, and a pillar box.

Grade II listed buildings from other areas in the city can be found through the box on the right, along with the lists of the Grade I and Grade II* buildings in the city.

Buildings
{|style="width:100%;border:0px;text-align:left;line-height:150%;"
|-valign="top"
|

See also

Architecture of Liverpool

References
Notes

Citations

Sources

External links
 Liverpool City Council listed buildings information page

Buildings in Liverpool 07
Listed buildings in Liverpool 07
Liverpool-related lists